Darrell Wayne Bevell (born January 6, 1970) is an American football coach who is the passing game coordinator and quarterbacks coach for the Miami Dolphins of the National Football League (NFL). He previously served as offensive coordinator for the Minnesota Vikings from 2006 to 2010, the Seattle Seahawks from 2011 to 2017, the Detroit Lions in 2019 and for the first 11 games of the 2020 season before being named the interim head coach for the remainder of the Lions season, and the Jacksonville Jaguars in 2021. Bevell played college football for the University of Wisconsin, where he was a four-year starting quarterback.

Playing career
After playing at Chaparral High School in Scottsdale, Arizona, Bevell redshirted as a freshman quarterback at Northern Arizona University.  At the time, Brad Childress was NAU's offensive coordinator.  Bevell then embarked on a two-year Latter-day Saint mission to Cleveland, Ohio.  When he returned from his missionary service, Childress had joined the staff of Barry Alvarez at Wisconsin. Bevell was offered scholarships from NAU and Utah, but he decided to join Childress at Wisconsin.

At that time, Wisconsin football had been struggling for many years.  Bevell was named the Badgers' starting quarterback in 1992.  In 1993, he led the team to a surprising "Cinderella" season.  They finished the year with a 10–1–1 record, becoming co-champions of the Big Ten and securing the school's first Rose Bowl invitation since 1963.  They ended the season by defeating the UCLA Bruins 21–16 in the 1994 Rose Bowl.  It was the school's first-ever Rose Bowl victory.  In the fourth quarter of that game, with Wisconsin clinging to a 14–10 lead, Bevell made the most memorable play of his college career.  Not known for his running ability, Bevell scrambled 21 yards down the left sideline for a touchdown that ultimately secured the victory.

The following season, Bevell again guided the Badgers to a winning season.  They defeated the Duke Blue Devils 34–20 in the 1995 Hall of Fame Bowl, giving Wisconsin back-to-back bowl wins for the first time ever.  Bevell finished his college career with 19 school records, including most passing yards in a single game (423) and in a career (7,686).

Coaching career

College

After going undrafted in the 1996 NFL Draft, Bevell began a career in coaching, including stints at Westmar University (Le Mars, IA), Iowa State University, and the University of Connecticut.

National Football League

Green Bay Packers

In 2000, Bevell was hired by the Green Bay Packers as an offensive assistant. In 2003, he was promoted to quarterbacks coach, where he worked with Brett Favre.

Minnesota Vikings

In 2006,  Brad Childress was hired as the head coach of the Minnesota Vikings, and he hired Bevell to become the offensive coordinator of the Vikings. In 2009, Bevell was reunited with Brett Favre, but this time being the offensive coordinator, and having the play-calling duties. In 2009, the Vikings had a successful season going 12-4 and advanced to the NFC Championship game, ultimately losing in overtime to the eventual Super Bowl champion New Orleans Saints. In the first season with Favre, Favre produced 4,202 passing yards with 33 touchdowns and accumulating a quarterback rating of 107.2, which was his career best. In 2010, Minnesota's season ended with 6-10 record, reflecting a number of disastrous moves throughout the season. Head coach Childress was fired midway through the season. He was replaced by defensive coordinator Leslie Frazier as interim head coach when Minnesota had 3-7 record, and finished 3-3 as interim head coach. In the 2011 season, Bevell was not retained as the offensive coordinator by new Vikings head coach Leslie Frazier. He was replaced by Bill Musgrave.

Seattle Seahawks
On January 21, 2011, Seattle Seahawks head coach Pete Carroll hired Bevell to become the new offensive coordinator after firing Jeremy Bates due to "offensive philosophy difference". The following season, the Seahawks finished 7-9, failing to defend their NFC West title or make the playoffs, while Bevell's offense was 28th in the league. Looking to upgrade from quarterback Tarvaris Jackson, Bevell scouted Wisconsin senior Russell Wilson. He was one of only a few scouts to attend Wilson's pro-day, and the Seahawks ultimately drafted him in the third round. Upon selecting Wilson, coach Pete Carroll stated, "It was Bevell's project."
The Seahawks also obtained Green Bay Packers back-up quarterback Matt Flynn, who many expected to be the starter. During training camp the quarterback competition was thinned out after Jackson was traded to the Buffalo Bills.

In 2012, the Seahawks named Wilson the starting quarterback for the season. The Seahawks finished the season with an 11-5 record, and took 2nd within the NFC West eventually losing in the Divisional round in the playoffs. In Bevell's second year with the Seahawks, offensively they were 17th in the league which was an improvement from the last season. In rushing the Seahawks were 3rd in league, previously being 21st in 2011, accumulating 2,579 yards and averaging 161.2 yards on the ground.

In 2013, the Seahawks finished the season with a 13-3 record and eventually defeated the Denver Broncos by a score of 43–8 in Super Bowl XLVIII. Bevell's rushing offense was 4th in the league with 2,188 yards and averaged 136.8 yards per game. Overall in total offense, Bevell's team finished 18th in the league, producing 339.0 yards per game.

In 2014, the Seahawks finished the season at 12-4 and attempted to repeat as Super Bowl champions. They came short in Super Bowl XLIX, which they lost to the New England Patriots after passing on 2nd and goal from the 1-yard line with 26 seconds left. Trailing 28–24, Russell Wilson targeted wide receiver Ricardo Lockette, but New England's Malcolm Butler made a game-saving interception with 20 seconds left on the clock. The play call was widely criticized.  "I can't believe the call," NBC color commentator Cris Collinsworth said after the play was run. "You have Marshawn Lynch. You have a guy who's been borderline unstoppable. ... If I lose this Super Bowl because Marshawn Lynch can't get into the end zone, so be it. So be it. I can't believe the call".  Sports Illustrated writer Peter King called the play one of the worst calls in Super Bowl history, and so did retired NFL hall of famer Deion Sanders.  Retired running back Emmitt Smith, the NFL's all-time leading rusher, went even further, calling it the worst play call in the history of football. Bevell acknowledged making the call, but also remarked that Lockette could have been more aggressive on the play. Wilson said the play was a "good call", and lamented throwing the interception and "not making that play." Carroll, though, said the last play was "all my fault", and called Bevell "crucially important to our future." The head coach added that Seattle would have run the ball on a subsequent play. "We don't ever call a play thinking we might throw an interception."

Bevell was dismissed from the Seahawks in January 2018.

Detroit Lions
On January 16, 2019, Bevell was hired by the Detroit Lions to be their offensive coordinator, replacing Jim Bob Cooter. On November 28, 2020, Bevell assumed the title of interim head coach following the firing of head coach Matt Patricia. On December 6, 2020, Bevell won his head coaching debut against the Chicago Bears by a score of 34–30. He missed the team's week 16 game against the Tampa Bay Buccaneers due to COVID-19 protocols.

Jacksonville Jaguars
On January 21, 2021, Bevell was hired by the Jacksonville Jaguars as their offensive coordinator under head coach Urban Meyer.  

For the second consecutive season, Bevell was named interim head coach after the Jaguars fired Meyer following a 2–11 start to the season.

Bevell led the Jaguars in the final four games of the 2021 season to finish 1–3 (.250) and 3–14 (.176) overall.

Miami Dolphins
On February 16, 2022, Bevell was hired by the Miami Dolphins to serve as the team's quarterbacks coach and passing game coordinator for the 2022 season.

Head coaching record

* Interim head coach

References

External links
 Miami Dolphins profile

1970 births
Living people
American football quarterbacks
UConn Huskies football coaches
Detroit Lions coaches
Green Bay Packers coaches
Iowa State Cyclones football coaches
Minnesota Vikings coaches
Seattle Seahawks coaches
Jacksonville Jaguars coaches
Wisconsin Badgers football players
National Football League offensive coordinators
Northern Arizona Lumberjacks football players
Players of American football from Arizona
People from Yuma, Arizona
Miami Dolphins coaches
Detroit Lions head coaches
Jacksonville Jaguars head coaches